Hasanabad (also Romanized as Ḩasanābād) is a village in Gifan Rural District, Garmkhan District, Bojnord County, North Khorasan Province, Iran. At the 2006 census, its population was 606, in 136 families.

References 

Populated places in Bojnord County